Isewal is a village located in the Ludhiana West tehsil, of Ludhiana district, Punjab.

Administration
The village is administrated by a Sarpanch S. Gurjeet Singh Sekhon of village as per constitution of India and Panchayati raj (India) since 2020.

Villages in Ludhiana West Tehsil

Air travel connectivity 
The closest airport to the village is Sahnewal Airport.

History
This village is famous as the birthplace of great Flying Officer Nirmal Jit Singh Sekhon, the recipient of Param Veer Chakra, India's highest military honour and medal.

References

Villages in Ludhiana West tehsil